Nemapogon anatolica is a moth of the family Tineidae. It is found in Croatia, Greece, Turkey and Jordan.

References

Moths described in 1986
Nemapogoninae